Kirill Olegovich Slepets (born 6 April 1999) is a Russian professional ice hockey winger currently playing for Sokol Krasnoyarsk in the Supreme Hockey League (VHL) while under contract to Amur Khabarovsk in the Kontinental Hockey League (KHL). He was selected 152nd overall by the Carolina Hurricanes in the 2019 NHL Entry Draft.

Playing career
As a youth Slepets played within the junior ranks of Lokomotiv Yaroslavl. He made his full professional debut in the 2018–19 season, appearing in 10 games with Lokomotiv Yaroslavl, scoring 1 goal. While showing a high offensive potential at the junior levels, Slepets was selected in the fifth round, 152nd overall in the 2019 NHL Entry Draft by the Carolina Hurricanes.

Slepets continued his development in Russia, playing in the second tier Supreme Hockey League with Buran Voronezh before he was traded by Lokomotiv to Latvian KHL club, Dinamo Riga, on 13 November 2019. In the 2019–20 season, Slepets made 33 appearances with Riga, posting 3 goals and 7 points. 

On 5 May 2020, Slepets was returned by Riga to Lokomotiv Yaroslavl in a trade for the rights to Brock Trotter. Slepets began the 2020–21 season with Buran Voronezh, regisitering 6 points through 17 games, before leaving the club. On 23 December 2020, Slepets continued in the VHL, signing with Neftyanik Almetievsk.

Following an offensively productive tenure with Neftyanik, Slepets returned to the KHL in the off-season, securing a one-year contract with HC Spartak Moscow on 9 August 2021. After attending the pre-season with Spartak, Slepets tenure with the club was short lived as he was traded prior to the 2021–22 season to hometown club, Amur Khabarovsk, in exchange for the rights to Andrei Loktionov on 25 August 2021.

Career statistics

Regular season and playoffs

International

Awards and honours

References

External links
 

1999 births
Living people
Amur Khabarovsk players
Buran Voronezh players
Carolina Hurricanes draft picks
Dinamo Riga players
HC Lada Togliatti players
Lokomotiv Yaroslavl players
Oulun Kärpät players
Russian ice hockey right wingers
HC Ryazan players
Sokol Krasnoyarsk players
Sportspeople from Khabarovsk